Samuel Lavrinčík (born 10 July 2001) is a Slovak footballer who plays as a midfielder.

Club career

AS Trenčín
Lavrinčík made his Fortuna Liga debut for AS Trenčín against Slovan Bratislava on 14 March 2021.

International career
Lavrinčík was first recognised in Slovak senior national team nomination in November 2022 by Francesco Calzona being listed as an alternate for two friendly fixtures against Montenegro and Marek Hamšík's retirement game against Chile. Subsequently, in December 2022, he was nominated  senior national team prospective players' training camp at NTC Senec.

References

External links
 AS Trenčín official club profile
 Futbalnet profile
 
 

2001 births
Living people
Footballers from Bratislava
Slovak footballers
Slovakia youth international footballers
Slovakia under-21 international footballers
Association football midfielders
ŠK Slovan Bratislava players
AS Trenčín players
2. Liga (Slovakia) players
Slovak Super Liga players